Charles Edward Briggs (4 April 1911 – 29 January 1993) was an English professional footballer who played as a goalkeeper in the Football League for Halifax Town and Rochdale.

Career statistics

References 

1911 births
1993 deaths
People from Liphook
English footballers
Association football goalkeepers
Haywards Sports F.C. players
Guildford City F.C. players
Fulham F.C. players
Tottenham Hotspur F.C. players
Crystal Palace F.C. players
Bradford (Park Avenue) A.F.C. players
Halifax Town A.F.C. players
Clyde F.C. players
Rochdale A.F.C. players
Chesterfield F.C. players
Southern Football League players
English Football League players
Brentford F.C. wartime guest players
Ransome & Marles F.C. players
Ilkeston Town F.C. (1945) players
Aldershot F.C. wartime guest players
Halifax Town A.F.C. wartime guest players
Fulham F.C. wartime guest players